Cornelia Molnar (born 26 November 1983) is a Croatian table tennis player. She competed for Croatia at the 2004 Summer Olympics and 2012 Summer Olympics.

References

External links
 
 

Croatian female table tennis players
Croatian people of Romanian descent
Table tennis players at the 2012 Summer Olympics
Olympic table tennis players of Croatia
1983 births
Living people
Competitors at the 2001 Mediterranean Games
Mediterranean Games medalists in table tennis
Mediterranean Games bronze medalists for Croatia
Sportspeople from Târgu Mureș